Enedin Mulalić (born 10 January 2004) is a Bosnian professional footballer who plays as a right-back for Bosnian Premier League club Sarajevo.

Club career
In April 2022, Mulalić signed for Sarajevo. He made his debut against Pošusje on 23 October 2022.

Career statistics

References

2004 births
Living people
People from Bužim
Bosnia and Herzegovina footballers
Bosnia and Herzegovina youth international footballers
Association football defenders
FK Sarajevo players
Premier League of Bosnia and Herzegovina players